Stahlnetz was a German police procedural television series with many similarities to Dragnet running from 1958 to 1968, and from 1999 to 2003.

See also
Episodes Stahlnetz 1958-1968
List of German television series

External links
 

German crime television series
1950s German police procedural television series
1960s German police procedural television series
1990s German police procedural television series
2000s German police procedural television series
1950s German television series
1958 German television series debuts
1968 German television series endings
1999 German television series debuts
2003 German television series endings
German-language television shows
Das Erste original programming